Katahariya  is a municipality in Rautahat District in the Narayani Zone of south-eastern Nepal. Before September 2017, Katahariya was one of the Village Development Committees with 8 wards. At the time of the 1991 Nepal census, it had a population of 4,619 people living in 835 individual households. Katahariya is famous for its vegetables and cattle market. It has a well-maintained Farmers' market (vegetable) and Cattle (domestic-animal) market. Katahariya is a fast-growing VDC, with the main occupations of local people being business and farming.

Katahariya became a municipality since September 2017 by merging different Gaupalika (previously VDCs) such as Hathiyahi, Birti Prastoka, Bhasedhawa, Bagahi, Balirampur, Pipra Pokhariya. Currently, there are 9 wards in this municipality. In the recent local level election conducted on 13 May 2022, Ajay Prakash Jaiswal from Nepali Congress became the mayor.

Other developments

Campus and school 
 Shree Janta Higher Secondary School kth

Hospital 
Katahariya PHCC,with 24 hour Emergency Service

Banks 
 Nepal Bank Limited - Katahariya Branch
 Gramin Bikash Bank Ltd
 Deprosc Laghubitta Bikas Bank Limited

Communication Networks 
 Nepal Telecom
 Ncell
Other cellular networks available are UTL Nepal and Smart Cell.

References

Populated places in Rautahat District
Nepal municipalities established in 2017
Municipalities in Madhesh Province